Muhammad Anis Matta (born December 7, 1968 at Bone, Southern Sulawesi) is a former Prosperous Justice Party (PKS) and now Gelora Party  politician. He was the secretary-general of PKS for four consecutive terms (1998–2013) and was appointed for the first time at the age of 29 before he was appointed as the party's president.

Early life and education
Anis Matta undertook undergraduate studies in Islamic Sharia from LIPIA in 1992 and in 2001, he enrolled at Lemhannas.

Political career
Anis's national political career began when he was elected member of the People's Representative Council for 2004–2009. Before he was elected, he was the Secretary General of PKS for two terms, 2003-2005 and 2005–2010. Anis was the Deputy Speaker of the People's Representative Council for 2009–2014, but resigned on February 1, 2013 to become the President of PKS.  He replaced Luthfi Hasan Ishaaq, who was convicted of corruption. On November 10, 2019, he was the leader of Indonesian People's Waves Party (Gelora Party) with Fahri Hamzah former Prosperous Justice Party.

Other activities
Before Anis entered politics, he was a member of the Muhammadiyah Hikma Assembly.

Personal life
Anis married Anaway Irianty Mansyur. The couple produced seven children. His decision to take a second wife, Szilvi Fabula, a young girl from Hungary in 2006 has led to controversy over polygamy.  With his second wife he has had three children.

References

1968 births
Living people
Indonesian Muslims
People from Bone Regency
Prosperous Justice Party politicians